St. Joseph’s Catholic School is a private, Roman Catholic, co-educational day school located in Greenville, South Carolina.

History

St. Joseph’s was founded in 1993 when nine people came together to create the school. They started their first year with a class of thirteen 9th graders and began with a donation of $800. The first thirteen students went to school with a complete college preparatory education, attended a P.E. class with the help of the local YMCA, and attended Mass every week. In January 1994, St. Joseph’s relocated to a campus that was 16,000 square feet. Later that year, in May, St. Joseph’s received full accreditation from the South Carolina Independent School Association. Later in the year, 47 students attended the school, and a 10th-grade class was added. In 1995 the school’s Math team won the statewide Math competition for their division, which had a big impact on the school’s achievements and future ambitions. By September 1996, St. Joseph’s had a full four-year high school program, and a middle school wing was added nearly ten years later in 2005. Later in November, the first on-campus gym was built. In addition to the continued rate of expansion of St. Joseph's, in 2008, the campus was expanded by adding extensions for the middle school and the athletics and fine arts departments. The school continues to grow, with a recent Middle school extension, adding two more floors in the Middle School wing.

References

Roman Catholic Diocese of Charleston
High schools in Greenville, South Carolina
Catholic secondary schools in South Carolina
Private middle schools in South Carolina
1993 establishments in South Carolina